The Fritz Walter Medal is a series of annual awards given by the German Football Association to youth footballers in Germany. First awarded in 2005, it is named in honour of Fritz Walter, captain of West Germany's 1954 FIFA World Cup-winning team.

Winners

2005

2006

2007

2008

2009

2010

2011

2012

2013

2014

2015

2016

2017

2018

2019

2020

2021 and 2022
Due to the ongoing COVID-19 pandemic, 2021 and 2022 awards both took place in 2022.

References

German football trophies and awards
Youth football in Germany
Awards established in 2005
2005 establishments in Germany